The Staatliche Hochschule für Musik und Darstellende Kunst Mannheim is a Hochschule, a university for music and performing arts in Mannheim, Germany, of the state Baden-Württemberg

History 
The Hochschule dates back to the 1762 Academie de Danse and the private Tonschule (Sound school), founded in 1776 at the court of Charles Theodore, Elector of Bavaria. They were later named Mannheimer Konservatorium and Städtische Hochschule für Musik und Theater. In 1971 the Heidelberger Konservatorium, founded in 1894, was included in a combined Hochschule with university status, run by the state Baden-Württemberg.

Graduate studies 
 Artistic education
 Music pedagogy
 School music
 Music research, media
 Jazz / Pop music
 Dance
 Dance pedagogy for children

Postgraduate studies 
 Solo
 Orchestra solo
 Dance pedagogy for professional dancers
 Artistic development (dance/stage)

Library Bibliothek 
The library contains around 17,500 books, 45,200 musical pieces and 11,000 recordings.

External links 
 

Universities in Germany
1971 establishments in Germany
Music schools in Germany
Universities and colleges in Baden-Württemberg